Chumeh-ye Khazaliyeh (also Romanized as Chūmeh-ye Khazʿalīyeh) is a village in Hoseyni Rural District, in the Central District of Shadegan County, Khuzestan Province, Iran. At the 2006 census, its population was 57, in 7 families.

References 

Populated places in Shadegan County